The 2017 Grand Slam of Darts, was the eleventh staging of the tournament, organised by the Professional Darts Corporation. The event took place from 11–19 November 2017 at the Wolverhampton Civic Hall, Wolverhampton, England.

The tournament's defending champion was Michael van Gerwen, who won the tournament in 2016 by defeating James Wade 16–8 in the final. He retained his title for a 3rd consecutive year by beating Peter Wright 16–12 in this year's final.

Prize money 
The prize fund for the Grand Slam was increased from £400,000 in 2016 to £450,000 in 2017, with the winner getting £110,000, as opposed to £100,000.

Qualifying

PDC qualifying tournaments 

At most sixteen players could qualify through this method, where the position in the list depicts the priority of the qualification.

In case the list of qualifiers from the main tournaments produced fewer than sixteen players, the field of sixteen players is filled from the reserve lists. The first list consists of the winners from 2017 European Tour events, in which the winners shall be selected in Order of Merit position order at the cut-off date.

Had there still been less than sixteen qualified players after the winners of European Tour events were added, the winners of 2017 Players Championships events would have been added, followed by the winners of qualifying tournaments for the 2017 UK Open. As there are already 16 qualified players after the first two qualification methods, no player will qualify via Players Championships and UK Open qualifying events. This resulted in Adrian Lewis missing the tournament for the first time.

PDC qualifying event
A further eight places in the Grand Slam of Darts will be filled by qualifiers from a PDC qualifier that took place in Wigan on 6 November.
These are the qualifiers:
 James Wilson
 Robbie Green
 Joe Murnan
 Alan Norris
 Jeffrey de Zwaan
 Darren Webster
 Steve Lennon
 Stephen Bunting

BDO qualifying tournaments

BDO ranking qualifiers
The remaining five BDO representatives were the top five non-qualified players from the BDO Invitational Rankings at 30 September 2017.

The five qualifiers were confirmed on 10 October 2017, and were:
 Mark McGeeney
 Jamie Hughes
 Scott Mitchell
 Ross Montgomery
 Cameron Menzies

Pools

Draw

Group stage
All group matches are best of nine legs  After three games, the top two in each group qualify for the knock-out stage
NB in Brackets: Number = Seeds; BDO = BDO Darts player; Q = Qualifier
NB: P = Played; W = Won; L = Lost; LF = Legs for; LA = Legs against; +/− = Plus/minus record, in relation to legs; Pts = Points; Status = Qualified to knockout stage

Group A

11 November

12 November

14 November

Group B

11 November

12 November

14 November

Group C

11 November

12 November

14 November

Group D

11 November

12 November

14 November

Nine dart shootout
With Mark Webster and Darren Webster finishing level on points and leg difference, a nine-dart shootout between the two took place to see who would play the Group C winner Phil Taylor in the second round. The match took place after the conclusion of Tuesday's group matches, and was the second year in succession that a nine-dart shootout was required. Mark Webster threw first.

Group E

11 November

12 November

13 November

Group F

11 November

12 November

13 November

Group G

11 November

12 November

13 November

Group H

11 November

12 November

13 November

Knockout stage

References 

2017
Grand Slam
Grand Slam of Darts
Grand Slam of Darts